Coffee with D is a 2017 Indian Hindi-language satirical film directed by Vishal Mishra and produced by Vinod Ramani, starring  Sunil Grover and Zakir Husain. Coffee with D was released on 20 January 2017. The film received mixed reviews from critics and failed commercially at the box office.

Plot
Arnab Ghosh is a Senior Editor and news anchor at NB news channel. He hosts a prime-time show, interviewing different people including politicians. Due to low ratings, his boss, Roy, transfers him to a cookery show and asks him to come up with a new idea for another show.

Parul, Arnab's wife, suggests he interviews feared Don/crime boss, D. Arnab and his colleagues shoot fake videos about D, and post them on social media in order to make D angry. He agrees to stop posting the videos after receiving a call from Girdhari, D's CEO, on the condition that D consents to be interviewed. D agrees, while planning to kill Arnab live, during the TV show.

Arnab and his colleagues are brought to a secret location in Karachi by D's men, while two other gangsters arrive at Arnab's home in order to hold his family hostage. Arnab starts the interview, however D does not answer any of the questions correctly.  Arnab receives a call from his wife, who asks him not to be a coward, but to prove D wrong. In the last part of the interview, Arnab accuses D of being responsible for terrorist activities, calling him a fraud and not a Don. On hearing this D dies of a heart attack.

Later, at his home, Arnab receives a call from a David Adrees Kaleman, who reveals himself to be D. A flashback shows that D only pretended to die, so that he could leave his original identity and begin a new life. Arnab is happy that there is no longer any persona such as D left in the world.

Cast

Soundtrack

Songs were composed by Superbia band members (Shaan, Gourav Dasgupta, and Roshin Balu). Sameer Anjaan is the lyricist. Dhruv Dhalla provided the background score.

Critical reception

Coffee with D received mixed reviews from critics.

BookMyShow wrote in its review "Sunil Grover, who is otherwise known for his acts in popular TV shows, makes it rather unsettling for the audience to see him play a role this serious initially. He, however, does not disappoint for most part of the film. Zakir Hussain, too, delivers a mindblowing performance as D. It is Pankaj Tripathi who plays D's right-hand man that steals the show with his spot-on comic timing, making us wish we saw more of him."
Bollywood Life rated the film 2.5/5, writing "Honestly, I went to watch the movie expecting to kill myself by the end of it. But it wasn’t as bad as I expected it to be. I had high hopes from Sunil Grover and he lived up to it for most part of the film." Subhash K. Jha also rated the film 2.5/5, writing "Coffee With D is like an unfinished unpolished version of what could have been a rollicking  run-in into a ruminative session between Indian’s biggest fugitive and loudest journalist. If only it had been allowed more leg-space to lunge in the lap of the ludicrous." The Times of India rated it 2/5, writing "To make a satire on Dawood Ibrahim is a brave effort, no doubt. But is it a successful effort? Barely."

Fullhyd.com rated the film 1.75/5, writing "Apart from the obviously incorrect caricature of the bombastic demeanour of India's most renown media personality, CWD's version of D lacks substance and depth. Although Zakir Hussain's emoting is satisfying, the character development isn't layered enough. Little research seems to have gone into the person. If you are going to ask some "tough" questions of and decode a hated don in the hit list of nearly 10 nations, the scripting and the emoting need to be up to the challenge. Instead, director Vishal Mishra shows how he isn't interested in judging D and how he hates to offend the gang and the nation." Koimoi rated the film 1.5/5, and wrote "Coffee With D is strictly avoidable. Don’t waste your money on this one!" Rohit Vats from Hindustan Times rated it 1.5/5, writing "A caricatured D and his antics, coupled with bad sound designing, make Coffee With D end nowhere close to a fun film it could have been." Financial Express rated it 1.5/5, and wrote "Spend your money on some cappuccino instead and save your brain cells." Rediff.com also rated it 1.5/5, writing "Coffee With D does not have a bad plot but it could do with a better on-screen translation. What lets down the film is the way it is executed and shot. The film's music and dubbing too are disappointing." News18 rated it 1/5, writing "To opt a theme impersonating a real-life don and a high-profile journalist maybe a brave attempt but in this case, it's neither successful nor entertaining." Firstpost rated the film 1/5, writing "It is infuriating to learn that a producer actually backed this bag of garbage in its entirety. Coffee With D made me angry because it has managed to come to theatres and get good time slots in prime halls despite being a zero, while some excellent small films never manage a theatrical release." Mayank Shekhar from Mid-Day rated the film 1/5, writing "What do we learn about Dawood, thanks to 'Coffee With D'? That he diverted the Malaysian Airline Flight 370, because he was travelling from KL to Karachi, but the flight itself was headed to Beijing. He just landed the plane in his house, and the missing passengers are now his servants. Eh? This is not even funny." Shubhra Gupta from The Indian Express rated it 0.5/5, writing "When the film is about Don Dawood and an Arnab Goswami doppelganger, you expect jokes galore. What you get instead is this craving to run as far away from theatre as possible." Film Companion rated it 0/5, writing "Instead of a rollicking clever satire, what we get is an amateur production with juvenile ideas and unfunny jokes." Yahoo.com wrote "Coffee With D aims for conversational comedy, but it never quite hits its stride. Grover, the television actor best known for his mimicry-based characters Gutthi and Rinku Bhabhi, is miscast as the hero of the enterprise. Grover doesn’t have the ability to command the big screen, and the absence of clever dialogue leaves him visibly floundering."

References

External links
 
 

2017 films
2010s Hindi-language films
India–Pakistan relations in popular culture
Indian satirical films
Films set in Karachi